The Fangcheng dialect (local Jyutping: Fong4sing4 baak4waa4; IPA:) also rendered Fongsing Jyut dialect, is a dialect of Yue (Cantonese), spoken in the southern area closer to the sea of former Fangcheng County(防城縣), which was divided present-day Dongxing City(東興市), Fangcheng District(防城區) and Gangkou District(港口區).

As a variety of Cantonese, it is intelligible with Guangzhou Cantonese.

Due to the policy on the promotion of Putonghua and the influx of foreign population who doesn't speak Yue Chinese, the level of dialect use among local young people is declining.

Phonology

Initials 

Except for most of the consonants that are the same as in Standard Cantonese, there are also several other consonants in Fangcheng Yue Dialect. The extended Jyutping(Jyut++) will be used to transcribe the phonemes as follows.

Rimes 

And two diphthongs only exist before -ŋ and -k, each pair of sounds of theirs has almost equal weight respectively, which do not lend themselves to analysis as ending analyzed to ending as -j or -w phonemely.

  

Finals 

Moreover, Fangcheng Yue finals exhibit the final consonants found in Middle Chinese, namely . Which are romanized as m, n, ng, p, t, and k respectively.

Tone 
Fangcheng Yue dialect has 6 or 7 tones.

References

Further reading 

Yue Chinese
Cantonese language